T. Robinson (full name and date of birth unknown) is a former Bermudian cricketer. Robinson's batting and bowling styles are unknown.

Robinson made a single List A appearance for Bermuda against Guyana in the 1998–99 Red Stripe Bowl. In a match which Guyana won by 152 runs, Robinson bowled four wicketless overs which conceded 27 runs in Guyana's innings of 235/3, while in Bermuda's chase he ended their innings of 83 all out unbeaten without scoring.

References

External links
T. Robinson at ESPNcricinfo
T. Robinson at CricketArchive

Living people
Bermudian cricketers
Year of birth missing (living people)